Phospholipids are a class of lipids whose molecule has a hydrophilic "head" containing a phosphate group and two hydrophobic "tails" derived from fatty acids, joined by an alcohol residue (usually a glycerol molecule). Marine phospholipids typically have omega-3 fatty acids EPA and DHA integrated as part of the phospholipid molecule. The phosphate group can be modified with simple organic molecules such as choline, ethanolamine or serine.

Phospholipids are a key component of all cell membranes. They can form lipid bilayers because of their amphiphilic characteristic. In eukaryotes, cell membranes also contain another class of lipid, sterol, interspersed among the phospholipids. The combination provides fluidity in two dimensions combined with mechanical strength against rupture. Purified phospholipids are produced commercially and have found applications in nanotechnology and materials science.

The first phospholipid identified in 1847 as such in biological tissues was lecithin, or phosphatidylcholine, in the egg yolk of chickens by the French chemist and pharmacist Theodore Nicolas Gobley.

Phospholipids in biological membranes

Arrangement
The phospholipids are amphiphilic. The hydrophilic end usually contains a negatively charged phosphate group, and the hydrophobic end usually consists of two "tails" that are long fatty acid residues.

In aqueous solutions, phospholipids are driven by hydrophobic interactions, which result in the fatty acid tails aggregating to minimize interactions with the water molecules. The result is often a phospholipid bilayer: a membrane that consists of two layers of oppositely oriented phospholipid molecules, with their heads exposed to the liquid on both sides, and with the tails directed into the membrane. That is the dominant structural motif of the membranes of all cells and of some other biological structures, such as vesicles or virus coatings.

In biological membranes, the phospholipids often occur with other molecules (e.g., proteins, glycolipids, sterols) in a bilayer such as a cell membrane. Lipid bilayers occur when hydrophobic tails line up against one another, forming a membrane of hydrophilic heads on both sides facing the water.

Dynamics
These specific properties allow phospholipids to play an important role in the cell membrane. Their movement can be described by the fluid mosaic model, which describes the membrane as a mosaic of lipid molecules that act as a solvent for all the substances and proteins within it, so proteins and lipid molecules are then free to diffuse laterally through the lipid matrix and migrate over the membrane. Sterols contribute to membrane fluidity by hindering the packing together of phospholipids. However, this model has now been superseded, as through the study of lipid polymorphism it is now known that the behaviour of lipids under physiological (and other) conditions is not simple.

Main phospholipids

Diacylglyceride structures
 See: Glycerophospholipid
 Phosphatidic acid (phosphatidate) (PA)
 Phosphatidylethanolamine (cephalin) (PE)
 Phosphatidylcholine (lecithin) (PC)
 Phosphatidylserine (PS)
 Phosphoinositides:
 Phosphatidylinositol (PI)
 Phosphatidylinositol phosphate (PIP)
 Phosphatidylinositol bisphosphate (PIP2) and
 Phosphatidylinositol trisphosphate (PIP3)

Phosphosphingolipids
 See Sphingolipid
 Ceramide phosphorylcholine (Sphingomyelin) (SPH)
 Ceramide phosphorylethanolamine (Sphingomyelin) (Cer-PE)
 Ceramide phosphoryllipid

Applications 
Phospholipids have been widely used to prepare liposomal, ethosomal and other nanoformulations of topical, oral and parenteral drugs for differing reasons like improved bio-availability, reduced toxicity and increased permeability across membranes. Liposomes are often composed of phosphatidylcholine-enriched phospholipids and may also contain mixed phospholipid chains with surfactant properties. The ethosomal formulation of ketoconazole using phospholipids is a promising option for transdermal delivery in fungal infections. Advances in phospholipid research lead to exploring these biomolecules and their conformations using lipidomics.

Simulations 
Computational simulations of phospholipids are often performed using molecular dynamics with force fields such as GROMOS, CHARMM, or AMBER.

Characterization 
Phospholipids are optically highly birefringent, i.e. their refractive index is different along their axis as opposed to perpendicular to it. Measurement of birefringence can be achieved using cross polarisers in a microscope to obtain an image of e.g. vesicle walls or using techniques such as dual polarisation interferometry to quantify lipid order or disruption in supported bilayers.

Analysis 
There are no simple methods available for analysis of phospholipids, since the close range of polarity between different phospholipid species makes detection difficult. Oil chemists often use spectroscopy to determine total phosphorus abundance and then calculate approximate mass of phospholipids based on molecular weight of expected fatty acid species. Modern lipid profiling employs more absolute methods of analysis, with NMR spectroscopy, particularly 31P-NMR, while HPLC-ELSD provides relative values.

Phospholipid synthesis 

Phospholipid synthesis occurs in the cytosolic side of ER membrane  that is studded with proteins that act in synthesis (GPAT and LPAAT acyl transferases, phosphatase and choline phosphotransferase) and allocation (flippase and floppase). Eventually a vesicle will bud off from the ER containing phospholipids destined for the cytoplasmic cellular membrane on its exterior leaflet and phospholipids destined for the exoplasmic cellular membrane on its inner leaflet.

Sources
Common sources of industrially produced phospholipids are soya, rapeseed, sunflower, chicken eggs, bovine milk, fish eggs etc. Phospholipids for gene delivery such as distearoylphosphatidylcholine, dioleoyl-3-trimethylammonium propane etc. are produced synthetically. Each source has a unique profile of individual phospholipid species, as well as fatty acids, and consequently differing applications in food, nutrition, pharmaceuticals, cosmetics and drug delivery.

In signal transduction
Some types of phospholipid can be split to produce products that function as second messengers in signal transduction. Examples include phosphatidylinositol (4,5)-bisphosphate (PIP2), that can be split by the enzyme phospholipase C into inositol triphosphate (IP3) and diacylglycerol (DAG), which both carry out the functions of the Gq type of G protein in response to various stimuli and intervene in various processes from long term depression in neurons to leukocyte signal pathways started by chemokine receptors.

Phospholipids also intervene in prostaglandin signal pathways as the raw material used by lipase enzymes to produce the prostaglandin precursors. In plants they serve as the raw material to produce jasmonic acid, a plant hormone similar in structure to prostaglandins that mediates defensive responses against pathogens.

Food technology
Phospholipids can act as emulsifiers, enabling oils to form a colloid with water. Phospholipids are one of the components of lecithin, which is found in egg yolks, as well as being extracted from soybeans, and is used as a food additive in many products and can be purchased as a dietary supplement. Lysolecithins are typically used for water–oil emulsions like margarine, due to their higher HLB ratio.

Phospholipid derivatives
 See table below for an extensive list.
 Natural phospholipid derivates:
 egg PC (Egg lecithin), egg PG, soy PC, hydrogenated soy PC, sphingomyelin as natural phospholipids.
 Synthetic phospholipid derivates:
 Phosphatidic acid (DMPA, DPPA, DSPA)
 Phosphatidylcholine (DDPC, DLPC, DMPC, DPPC, DSPC, DOPC, POPC, DEPC)
 Phosphatidylglycerol (DMPG, DPPG, DSPG, POPG)
 Phosphatidylethanolamine (DMPE, DPPE, DSPE DOPE)
 Phosphatidylserine (DOPS)
 PEG phospholipid (mPEG-phospholipid, polyglycerin-phospholipid, functionalized-phospholipid, terminal activated-phospholipid)

Abbreviations used and chemical information of glycerophospholipids

See also
 Cable theory
 Galactolipid
 Sulfolipid

References 

 
Anionic surfactants